"Sleeping Child" is a song by Danish soft rock band Michael Learns to Rock, released in 1993 as the first single from their second album Colours. Jascha Richter composed the song.

Chart performance
Although the song itself did not reach the charts, the album Colours had some success, reaching number 43 in Sweden.

Music video 
The video opens in a scene with the band members performing at night. A child then plays nearby. As the band members sing along, the child observes the night sky with a telescope. He sees the earth through the telescope and that scene is then synchronized with the line of the song "you build your own paradise". The video ends after the band finishes singing the song.

Track listing

References

External links
 Music video at YouTube

1993 songs
1993 singles
Michael Learns to Rock songs
Songs written by Jascha Richter